Nathan Barr (born February 9, 1973; also known as Nate Barr) is an American film and television composer and musician. His television scores include True Blood, The Americans, Carnival Row, and The Great. He won a Primetime Emmy Award for Outstanding Main Title Theme Music in 2020 for his work on the miniseries Hollywood.

Life and career

Barr started studying music in Tokyo, Japan at the age of four. He studied cello and English literature at Skidmore College.

In 1996, Barr moved to Los Angeles to pursue a career in composing film and television scores. One of his first jobs was working under the tutelage of  Hans Zimmer on the films As Good as It Gets and The Prince of Egypt. After 8 months with Zimmer, Barr landed an agent and branched out on his own. Since then, Barr has scored a large array of feature films and TV series, including all episodes of HBO's series True Blood.

In 2009, Barr co-wrote and produced a song with Pete Townshend for FX's The Americans called “It Must Be Done” and in 2005 Barr hired Billy Gibbons from ZZ Top to play guitar on his score for The Dukes Of Hazzard.

Filmography

Film

Television series

Awards
 2010 BMI Award for Original Score for True Blood Season 2 (HBO)
 2009 Hollywood Media in Music Award for Best Score for True Blood (HBO)
 2009 BMI Award for Original Score for True Blood (HBO)
 2006 BMI Award for Music for Film: The Dukes of Hazzard

|-
! scope="row" rowspan="2"| 
| rowspan="6"| Primetime Emmy Award
| rowspan="4"| Outstanding Original Main Title Theme Music
| The Americans
| 
|rowspan="2"| 
|-
| Hemlock Grove
| 
|-
! scope="row" rowspan="3"| 
| Carnival Row
| 
| rowspan="4"| 
|-
| rowspan="2"| Hollywood
| 
|-
| rowspan="2"|Outstanding Music Composition for a Limited Series, Movie, or Special
| 
|- 
! scope="row" rowspan="1"| 
| A Very British Scandal
|

References

External links 
 
 
 Official Facebook

1973 births
Living people
American classical cellists
American expatriates in Italy
American expatriates in Japan
American expatriates in Switzerland
American film score composers
American male film score composers
American multi-instrumentalists
Place of birth missing (living people)
American television composers
Bisexual men
Bisexual musicians
Juilliard School alumni
LGBT film score composers
American LGBT musicians
Musicians from Tokyo
Primetime Emmy Award winners
Skidmore College alumni
Varèse Sarabande Records artists